In 24 Hours is a monthly travel television program on CNN International hosted by James Williams.

The program premiered on 9 December 2015 and follows Williams spending a full day and night in a different city each episode, exploring culture, sights and unique experiences, focusing on the premium travel market. In many episodes, local celebrities are featured including Andrew Lloyd Webber and Anthony Bourdain.

Williams was a producer and occasional presenter on long running CNN travel program CNN Business Traveller before being given his own show.

The first and second seasons of the program are sponsored by Qatar Airways. The program returned for a second season on September 7, 2016.

Episodes

Season 1

Season 2

References

External links
 

American travel television series
CNN original programming
English-language television shows
2010s American television news shows
2015 American television series debuts